Iwo Gall (born 1 April 1890 in Krakow; died 12 February 1959) was a Polish theater director, stage designer and pedagogue.

Biography 
He graduated from the Academy of Fine Arts in Cracow, then studied in Berlin and Vienna, where during World War I he worked with the Polish theater. After the war he worked at the Teatrze im. Juliusza Słowackiego w Krakowie, and then collaborated with Juliusz Osterwa's "Reduta " (mainly as a stage designer). He was the director of the Chamber Theater in Czestochowa (1932-1935). During the Nazi occupation he ran a secret drama studio, which was functioning until the outbreak of the Warsaw Uprising and from April 1945 resumed operations in Cracow.

Decorations 
 Order of the Labor Standard II (1949)
 Officer's Cross of the Order of Polonia Restituta (1957)

References 

1890 births
1959 deaths
Polish theatre directors